Country Memories is a studio album by Slim Whitman, released in 1967 on Imperial Records.

Billboard wrote in its review: "Always great, but never greater than now, Slim Whitman has a beautiful 'Broken Wings,' a haunting 'Hasta Luego,' and exceptional versions of the classic standards 'I Walk Alone' and 'Tears on My Pillow' in this chart package."

Track listing 
The album was issued in the United States and Canada by Imperial Records as a 12-inch long-playing record, catalog numbers LP-9356 (mono) and LP-12356 (stereo).

Charts

References 

1967 albums
Slim Whitman albums
Imperial Records albums